Edvin Leonard Bergroth (26 December 1836 – 29 March 1917) was a Finnish engineer, businessman and vuorineuvos.

Bergroth studied engineering in Hannover. After returning to Finland, he worked for the Finnish State Railways and a gasworks, until he moved to Caucasus to work for Branobel. When he returned to Finland in 1890, he worked in many companies. Bergroth managed the newly re-established Hietalahti Shipyard and Engineering Works in 1895–1900.

Between 1905 and 1915, Bergroth was board member of Tampere Linen and Iron Industry. As a chairman, he initiated several development projects which grew the company and improved its productivity.

Bergroth was married twice. Four of his children lived until adult age.

Early life and studies 
Bergroth's parents were Pihlajavesi chaplain Johan Mikael Bergroth and Emma Lovisa née Cajanus; the father died when Bergroth was just six years old. He did his matriculation exam in Nikolaistad Gymnasium in 1857 and went to study engineering. After getting a scholarship, he continued in Hannover Polytechnic School in Prussia in 1858 and graduated engineer in 1860.

Career in Hannover, Helsinki and Caucasus 
Bergroth worked for the Royal Prussian Mint in Hannover until 1861, and, upon returning to Finland, for a short time for the Finnish State Railways. Bergroth managed construction of Leppäkoski railway bridge in 1862. In the same year, Bergroth was appointed Technical Manager of Helsinki Gas Illumination Company. The company was a private monopoly, that had been granted in 1860 an exclusive permit for street illumination until 1900 in those areas of Helsinki, where it had built the network. Bergroth travelled to Germany and Switzerland for a field trip visiting the local gas works and collecting knowledge. At the time, he left the company in 1884, he had become its manager. Bergroth moved to Branobel in Baku, Caucasus, where he earned a Technical Manager vacance. Bergroth returned to Finland in 1890, after which he worked for a number of companies. Until 1892, he was inspector in Finnish Sawmills Fire Assistance Association. One of the employers was Nokia, where he worked from 1890 until 1913. By time, Bergroth gained reputation as businessman. When Hietalahti Shipyard and Engineering Works was re-established after bankruptcy on 18 November 1895, Bergroth was selected its first manager. During his leadership, the company enlarged its premises and invested heavily on facilities and machinery. Considering the limited amount of capital and the market situation, Bergroth's management was successful. He left his position in 1900, but continued as board member after that.

By the 1880s, city of Helsinki had become increasingly dissatisfied on Bergroth's old employer, the gas illumination company, which was unwilling to invest on new light technology and produced gas inefficiently by burning wood. In November 1899, the city took over the gas distribution; Bergroth was appointed to the board of the new City of Helsinki Illumination Works.

Tampere Linen and Iron Industry 
In 1905, Bergroth became board member in Tampere Linen and Iron Industry company and in the following year he became chairman of board. The company underwent thorough renewal under Bergroth's chairmanship, and many of the changes were initiated by him. The company invested on new buildings and machinery for linen production, increasing both capacity and productivity. During the economic upswing prior to First World War, the company invested on production of various yarn types, canvas, sailcloth and plain weave for bedclothes. The investments continued also during the war, when new linen storage and weaving facility were built. Bergroth left the board in 1915.

Political career 
Bergroth was member of Helsinki City Council in 1875–1877, 1880–1882 and 1897–1899. He represented Helsinki bourgeoisie in Diet of Finland in 1882 and 1899. Bergroth took part in number of state committees, Swedish-speaking technical association,  voluntary fire brigade activities and charity work.

Personal life 
In 1864, Bergroth married Lydia née von Essen, daughter of professor Carl Gustaf von Essen and Catalina Sofia née Arppe. Between 1865 and 1871, they had three daughters and four sons. After Lydia Bergroth's death in 1872, he was married to Evelina née Bergroth, whose parents were vicar Carl Edvard Bergroth and Carolina Amalia née Stenbäck. They had a son in 1876. In total, four of Bergroth's children survived until adult age.

Sources

References 

Finnish engineers
Finnish chief executives
Finnish businesspeople
Tampella
1836 births
1917 deaths